This list is of the Cultural Properties of Japan designated in the category of  for the Urban Prefecture of Ōsaka.

National Cultural Properties
As of 1 February 2016, one hundred and twenty-two Important Cultural Properties have been designated (including nine *National Treasures), being of national significance.

Prefectural Cultural Properties
As of 12 March 2020, eighteen properties have been designated at a prefectural level.

Municipal Cultural Properties
Properties designated at a municipal level include:

See also
 Cultural Properties of Japan
 List of National Treasures of Japan (paintings)
 Japanese painting
 List of Historic Sites of Japan (Ōsaka)

References

External links
  Cultural Properties in Ōsaka Prefecture

Cultural Properties,Ōsaka
Cultural Properties,Paintings
Paintings,Ōsaka